Wentworth Canning Blackett Beaumont, 1st Viscount Allendale PC, JP, DL (2 December 1860 – 12 December 1923), styled The Hon. Wentworth Beaumont between 1906 and 1907, and Lord Allendale from 1907, was a British Liberal politician.

Background and education
Beaumont was born at Bywell Hall, Northumberland, the son of Wentworth Beaumont, 1st Baron Allendale, by his first wife Lady Margaret Anne de Burgh, daughter of Ulick de Burgh, 1st Marquess of Clanricarde, and his wife Harriet Canning, daughter of George Canning. He was baptised in London. He attended Eton and graduated from Trinity College, Cambridge with an MA in 1888.

Political career
Beaumont was Member of Parliament for Hexham from 1895 to 1907 and served under Sir Henry Campbell-Bannerman as Vice-Chamberlain of the Household from 1905 to February 1907, when he succeeded his father in the barony of Allendale. He was appointed Captain of the Yeomen of the Guard in April 1907 and was sworn of the Privy Council the following month. On 5 July 1911 he was created Viscount Allendale, of Allendale and Hexham in the County of Northumberland, and from October of that year to 1916 he was a Lord-in-waiting under H. H. Asquith. Beaumont was also appointed a deputy lieutenant of Northumberland in September 1901.

Family
Lord Allendale married Lady Alexandrina Vane-Tempest, daughter of George Vane-Tempest, 5th Marquess of Londonderry, on 12 November 1889. They had six children:

Wentworth Henry Canning Beaumont, 2nd Viscount Allendale (6 August 1890 – 16 December 1956).
Margaret Helen Beaumont (13 November 1892 – 10 June 1958), married the 5th Earl Fortescue and had issue.
Aline Mary de Burgh Beaumont (23 April 1895 – 15 April 1967).
Diane Beaumont (1896–31 January 1897).
Ralph Edward Blackett Beaumont (12 February 1901 – 18 September 1977).
Agatha Violet Beaumont (26 December 1903 – 15 January 1994).

Lord Allendale died in London in December 1923, aged 63, and was buried in the grounds of Bretton Hall, near Wakefield.

References

External links 
 

1860 births
1923 deaths
Alumni of Trinity College, Cambridge
Deputy Lieutenants of Northumberland
English justices of the peace
Beaumont, Wentworth
Liberal Party (UK) Lords-in-Waiting
Members of the Privy Council of the United Kingdom
Beaumont, Wentworth
People educated at Eton College
1
Eldest sons of British hereditary barons
Beaumont, Wentworth
Beaumont, Wentworth
Beaumont, Wentworth
UK MPs who were granted peerages
UK MPs who inherited peerages
Viscounts created by George V